Cloughoughter Castle is a ruined circular castle on a small island in Lough Oughter,  east of the town of Killeshandra in County Cavan, Ireland.

History

Origins and construction

The castle is located in the historic Kingdom of Breifne, specifically in the part that would later be subdivided into East Breifne, roughly corresponding to County Cavan. The spot may have been a crannóg, or artificially created island, and it is possible there was a fortification there as early as the sixth century. In the latter part of the 12th century, it was owned by the O'Rourkes, but early in the 13th century seems to have come into the hands of the Anglo-Norman de Lacy family. It is estimated construction of the castle started in the first quarter of the 13th century since architectural elements date the lower two storeys to this time.

In 1233, the O'Reilly clan took possession of the area and completed the castle. They retained it for centuries in the midst of their ongoing conflicts with the O'Rourkes and with members of their own clan. It was there that Philip O'Reilly was imprisoned in the 1360s with "no allowance save a sheaf of oats for day and night and a cup of water, so that he was compelled to drink his own urine."

Post 1610
After the land confiscations that followed the Plantation of Ulster in 1610, Cloughoughter was granted to Captain Hugh Culme. In 1641, Philip O'Reilly, MP for Cavan and a prominent leader of the Irish Rebellion of 1641, seized control of the castle, which he held until 1653. During this phase of its existence, it was used as a jail, with Culme himself being one of the prisoners, along with his son-in-law Henry Jones. Another was William Bedell, Bishop of Kilmore in the Church of Ireland, who died in February 1642, evidently due to inadequate shelter from the cold winter.

In 1649 Owen Roe O'Neill, commander of the Ulster Army died at the castle. In March 1653, it was besieged by Commonwealth forces under Sir Theophilus Jones, brother of Henry and thus related by marriage to the Culme family. It was the last major position Confederacy position to surrender on 27 April.

Jones set up his artillery in the nearby townland of Innishconnell and the damage caused by cannon shot, remain to this day. Left in ruins, the castle became a frequent subject of art in the 18th and 19th centuries. Its visual impact was described in a travelogue published in The Dublin University Magazine in 1852:
It stands on a small island, scarce three hundred feet in diameter, just sufficient to contain the castle and a small margin of rock around it. The island stands in very deep water; the shores are a mile distant, wild, yet thickly wooded. The castle is a beautiful ruin, round, massive, hoary, save where mantled with rich Irish ivy. The walls are immensely thick, with embrasures and coved windows, round which "ruin greenly dwells." It is unlike most Irish castles, which are square.

Conservation efforts were begun on the castle in 1987. The structure is protected under the National Monuments Act.

References

Notes

Sources

 
 
 
 
 

Cloughoughter Castle
National Monuments in County Cavan
Castles in County Cavan